At Rear House is the debut studio album by the American band Woods, released in 2007 on Woodsist.

Track listing

References

2007 debut albums
Woods (band) albums
Woodsist albums